James Harkness  (born 20 October 1935) is a Church of Scotland  minister.

Biography
Harkness was born in Thornhill, Dumfries and Galloway on 20 October 1935   and educated at the University of Edinburgh.

He was Assistant Minister at North Morningside. He joined the Royal Army Chaplains' Department (RAChD) in 1961 and served four years with the King's Own Scottish Borderers and four years with the Queen’s Own Highlanders. He was in Singapore between 1969 and 1970 and then Deputy Warden of the RAChD Centre until 1974. He was then Senior Chaplain in Northern Ireland (1974–75) and then the 4th Division (1975–78). He was Assistant Chaplain General in Scotland (1980–81), Senior Chaplain to the 1st British Corps (1981–82) and to the BAOR (1982–84). In 1985 he became Deputy Chaplain General  to the British Armed Forces after which he was Chaplain General from  1987 to 1995- the first non Anglican appointment.

He was Moderator of the General Assembly of the Church of Scotland from 1995 to 1996 when he became Dean of the Chapel Royal in Scotland- a post he held for a decade. An Honorary Chaplain to the Queen in Scotland,
he has been Dean to the Venerable Order of St John since 2005.  He was appointed Officer to the Venerable Order of St John in December 1988 and Knight of the Venerable Order of St John in January 2012.

References

People from Thornhill, Dumfries and Galloway
Moderators of the General Assembly of the Church of Scotland
20th-century Ministers of the Church of Scotland
Chaplains General to the Forces
Honorary Chaplains to the Queen
Deans of the Chapel Royal in Scotland
Officers of the Order of the British Empire
Companions of the Order of the Bath
Knights Commander of the Royal Victorian Order
Alumni of the University of Edinburgh
1935 births
Living people
Scottish military chaplains
19th-century Ministers of the Church of Scotland